Year 12 is an educational year group in schools in many countries including England and Wales, Northern Ireland, Australia and New Zealand. It is sometimes the twelfth year of compulsory education, or alternatively a year of post-compulsory education. It usually incorporates students aged between 16 and 18, depending on the locality. It is also known as "senior year" in parts of Australia, where it is the final year of compulsory education. Year Twelve in England and Wales, and in New Zealand, is the equivalent of Eleventh grade, junior year, or grade 11 in the US and parts of Canada.

Australia
In Australia, Year 12 is either the 12th or 13th year of compulsory education or the first or second year of post-compulsory education, depending on the state. However, one may leave school in year 10, after completing a series of compulsory tests, unless in Victoria, where no tests are required. It is the third year of "senior school", following Year 10/11 and sixth year of high school. Most students in Year 12 are aged between 17 and 18.

New Zealand
In New Zealand, Year 12 is the 12th full year of compulsory education, with students entering Year 12 generally aged between 15 & 1/2 and 17.  The minimum age for leaving compulsory education is 16 years of age, so for some students this is their last year of compulsory education. Year 12 pupils are educated in Secondary schools or in Area schools. Year Twelve was previously known as the 6th form and most students will be studying for NCEA Level 2. It is followed by Year 13, the final year of secondary education in New Zealand.

United Kingdom

England and Wales
Year 12 is the 12th year after Reception. In England, it is one option for the second-to-last year of compulsory education  and usually forms part of a sixth form or sixth form college. It is also known as the "Lower sixth", with "Upper sixth" being Year 13 in a sixth form; in independent or vocational colleges these titles are not used. Years twelve and thirteen comprise Key Stage 5.  In England, students of Year 12 age must continue their education in some form, but this can be part-time as part of an apprenticeship or traineeship, or alongside work.  In Wales, Year 12 is not part of compulsory education.
Year 12 is the first year of Key Stage 5, when the students are age 16 by August 31st.

Students in Year 12 in England and Wales can study A Level qualifications in sixth form college, or alternatively the more vocational BTEC. Students have the option to stay at the school where they studied their GCSE (or equivalent) qualifications, or move to another educational facility. There are many subjects available to study at AS Level in Year 12 including sciences, mathematics, humanities and languages but also vocational subjects such as art & design, drama and IT.

Scotland
In Scotland, 'Year Twelve' is known as fifth year or S5 and is the second last year of High School. Pupils can legally drop out at the end of fourth year (aged 16), making fifth and sixth year not compulsory.

Northern Ireland

In Northern Ireland, Year 12 is the fifth and final year of compulsory post-primary education. Students in Year 12 are aged between 15 and 16. It is the final year of Key Stage 4.

References

12